Is This the Life We Really Want? is the fourth solo album by the English rock musician Roger Waters, released on 2 June 2017 by Columbia Records. It was produced by Nigel Godrich, who urged Waters to make a more concise, less theatrical album. It was Waters' first solo album since Amused to Death (1992), and his first studio work since the opera Ça Ira (2005). 

The album reached number three in the UK and number 11 in the United States. It produced four singles: "Smell the Roses", "Déjà Vu", "The Last Refugee" and "Wait for Her".

Recording
Is This the Life We Really Want? was recorded in Los Angeles and London. It was produced by the Radiohead producer Nigel Godrich, who met Waters when he produced the 2015 live album Roger Waters: The Wall. Though Waters had not heard Godrich's work with Radiohead, they got on well and discussed working together. Godrich, a fan of Waters' work with Pink Floyd, was frank with Waters, telling him he found some of his solo work "unlistenable". However, he was reassured that Waters "really still had it" after hearing his demo of "Déjà Vu".

Godrich wanted to create a pared-back album to showcase Waters "the poet". He felt Waters' creativity had been invigorated by the Wall Live tour, and that his role as producer was "to push him a little bit". He encouraged Waters to make a concise record, reminding him that Pink Floyd's 1973 album The Dark Side of the Moon is only 43 minutes long. Unlike most of Waters' work, Waters did not co-produce the record; he said: "[Godrich] did a brilliant job ... I sat on my hands with lips zipped. You've rented this dog, let it work." Godrich used tape loops and found sounds extensively to create segues between tracks. He is also credited for arrangement, sound collages, keyboards, guitar, and mixing.

Themes
Waters initially planned to record a concept album; he conceived a radio play about a man and his granddaughter investigating why children are being killed in other parts of the world. He described the play as "part magic carpet ride, part political rant, part anguish", and said it featured about a dozen songs. Godrich persuaded Waters to abandon the theatrical elements and create a "less linear" work. Waters said he planned to produce the original idea in the future.

Waters said of the album's themes:

Waters also said the album had been influenced by having fallen in love:

The album also contains lyrics criticizing then-US President Donald Trump and his administration, as well as samples of Trump speaking. Matilda Berke of Atwood Magazine noted that, "Upon closer inspection, however, it becomes clear that Waters has larger targets than a single orange-haired demagogue. [...] Apathy, it seems, is Roger Waters' primary foe."

Release
Is This the Life We Really Want? was released on 2 June 2017 by Columbia Records. It was Waters' first solo album since Amused to Death (1992). The album peaked at number 3 in the United Kingdom and number 11 in the United States before falling off the US charts in four weeks. It produced four singles: "Smell the Roses" released on 20 April, "Déjà Vu" released on 8 May, "The Last Refugee" released on 19 May and "Wait for Her" released on 19 July in 2017. The album was blocked from release in Italy after the artist Emilio Isgrò alleged that the cover art plagiarised his work.

Critical reception

At Metacritic, which assigns a normalized rating out of 100 to reviews from critics, the album received an average score of 72, based on 16 reviews, indicating "generally favorable reviews". Rolling Stone said: "The music is quintessential post-Dark Side Of The Moon Floyd, but channeled by offspring: producer Nigel Godrich brings prog-rock grandeur, multi-instrumentalist Jonathan Wilson microdose psychedelia, Lucius alt-R&B backing vocals." Drowned in Sound said the album is "a long, sprawling epic that stretches out for its slightly-padded running time, but one so full of ideas and intricacies that it's an easy album to get sucked into." 

Consequence of Sound said the album "is easily the most accessible of Waters' solo work—a distillation in many regards of the anti-fascist, anti-imperialist, anti-greed messages he's been broadcasting since Pink Floyd". Pitchfork said the "myriad sonic references to his work with Pink Floyd suggest that Waters is comfortable with his past. The more you accept how much his past reflects in his present, the more receptive you'll be to this album's charms."

Track listing

Personnel
 Roger Waters – vocals, acoustic guitar, bass 
 Gus Seyffert – guitar, keyboards, bass
 Nigel Godrich – guitar, keyboards, sound collages, arrangements
 Jonathan Wilson – guitar, keyboards
 Roger Joseph Manning Jr. – keyboards
 Lee Pardini – keyboards
 Joey Waronker – drums 
 Jessica Wolfe – vocals
 Holly Laessig – vocals
 David Campbell – string arrangements

Charts

Weekly charts

Year-end charts

Certifications

References

External links

2017 albums
Concept albums
Political music albums by English artists
Roger Waters albums
Albums produced by Nigel Godrich
Columbia Records albums